Manuel González may refer to:

Sports

Association football (soccer)
Manuel González (footballer, 1917-1988), Spanish footballer
Manuel González (footballer, 1929-2013), Spanish footballer
Manuel González (footballer, born 1943), Spanish footballer
Manuel González (footballer, born 1953), Spanish footballer
Manuel González (footballer, born 1991), Argentine footballer

Other sports
Manuel González (sport shooter) (born 1934), Colombian Olympic sport shooter
Manuel González Rivera (1936–2004), Mexican professional wrestler best known under the ring name Dr. Wagner
Manuel González (fencer) (born 1950), Cuban Olympic fencer
Manuel Gonzalez (sailor) (born 1957), Chilean sailor
Manuel González (athlete) (born 1963), Spanish Olympic sprinter
Manuel González (equestrian) (born 1994), Mexican equestrian
Manuel González (motorcyclist) (born 2002), Spanish motorcyclist

Others
Manuel González Flores (1833–1893), Mexican military officer, politician, and president of Mexico, 1880–1884
Manuel González Prada (1844–1918), Peruvian politician
Manuel González Zeledón (1864–1936), Costa Rican writer
Manuel González García (bishop) (1877–1940), Spanish Catholic bishop, 1935–1940

See also
 Manuel González-Hontoria y Fernández-Ladreda (1878–1954), Spanish politician and diplomat
 Manuel Gonzales (1913–1993), Spanish-American Disney comics artist
 Juan Manuel González (disambiguation), several people
 Manuel González (Mexico City Metrobús), a BRT station in Mexico City
 Manuel T. Gonzaullas